Omari Rashid Nundu (6 August 1948 – 11 September 2019) was a Tanzanian CCM politician and Member of Parliament for Tanga City constituency since 2010 to 2015.

References

1948 births
2019 deaths
Chama Cha Mapinduzi MPs
Tanzanian MPs 2010–2015
Karimjee Secondary School alumni
Alumni of the University of Glasgow
Alumni of Cranfield University